Raimundo Ignacio Andueza Palacio (6 February 1846 – 17 August 1900), was the president of Venezuela (1890–1892). He also served twice as his country's Minister of Foreign Affairs.

A member of the Liberal Party, Andueza entered politics as deputy for Aragua. He was the Minister of Finance from 1877 to 1878.

Presidency and the revolucion legalistica
He became president on 7 March 1890, taking up residence in the Yellow House. He left office under duress. His presidential term was due to end in 1892, but he tried to extend it, resulting in resistance known as the revolucion legalistica. He stepped down on 17 June 1892 under pressure from the armed intervention of Joaquín Crespo.

Subsequent career
Andueza went into exile, not returning until after Crespo's death in 1898. He served as Minister of Foreign Affairs under Cipriano Castro from 1899 to 1900, the year of his death.

Personal life
He was born in Guanare, Portuguesa state, 6 February 1846, son of Raimundo Andueza and Carolina Palacio. Cousin of Venezuelan President Victorino Marquez Bustillos.

Palacio was married to Isabel González Esteves, who served as First Lady of Venezuela from 1890 until 1892.

He died in Caracas, 17 August 1900 and was buried in the city's Southern General Cemetery.

See also
President of Venezuela 
List of Ministers of Foreign Affairs of Venezuela

References 

  Raimundo Andueza Palacio

External links

 

1846 births
1900 deaths
Burials in Venezuela
People from Guanare
Presidents of Venezuela
Venezuelan Ministers of Foreign Affairs
Finance ministers of Venezuela
Central University of Venezuela alumni
19th-century Venezuelan lawyers
Great Liberal Party of Venezuela politicians
Venezuelan people of Spanish descent